Lars Kehl (born 8 April 2002) is a German professional footballer who plays as a midfielder for SC Freiburg II.

International career
Kehl has represented Germany at youth international level.

Career statistics

Club

References

2002 births
Living people
People from Ortenaukreis
Sportspeople from Freiburg (region)
Footballers from Baden-Württemberg
German footballers
Association football midfielders
Germany youth international footballers
3. Liga players
Offenburger FV players
SC Freiburg players
SC Freiburg II players